José Sergio Vega Cuamea (September 12, 1969 – June 26, 2010), better known by his stage name "El Shaka", was a Regional Mexican singer.  He was born in Ejido Hornos, Sonora, located near Ciudad Obregón in Mexico. On June 26, 2010, he was killed by gunfire in the Mexican state of Sinaloa after a car chase. The assailants pursued Sergio Vega for a distance, shooting at him and his passenger Montiel Sergio Ávila 30 times. He was killed and Ávila was seriously injured. Vega had recently increased his security because of other celebrity deaths like that of Sergio Gómez.

Career
Vega, eighth of thirteen children, immigrated to the United States in 1988.

In 1994, after five years with the group and following a falling out with his brothers, Vega decided to leave, forming another group called Los Rayos del Norte, and signing with Digital Universal. This group had hits such as "Las Parcelas de Mendoza", "El Dólar Doblado", "El Ayudante", "Olor a Hierba", "Eres mi Estrella", and "Ayúdame a Vivir". 

After three years under this name Vega decided, for publicity reasons, to change the name of his group to Sergio Vega y Sus Shakas Del Norte, which it has remained  Two of his most recent album releases included Me Gusta Estar Contigo (2004), and Cuando El Sol Salga Al Reves (2007) and his latest album El Jefe De Plazas (2008) with hits like "Disculpe Usted" and "Que Se Mueran Los Feos".

Death
On June 26, 2010, Vega was murdered while on his way to perform at a village festival concert in the Mexican state of Sinaloa. Gunmen travelling in a truck drove alongside his red Cadillac and opened fire on the vehicle. They then reportedly fired shots at Vega's head and chest from close range.

At the time of his death, rumours had been circulating online that he had already been killed. Just hours before he was shot, Vega was interviewed for an article on entertainment website La Oreja, in which he confirmed he was still alive. 

Vega was a singer of narcocorridos — ballads that celebrate the lives of drug dealers. Musicians who play this kind of music in Mexico are known to sometimes become the targets of rival gangs.

Discography
1999: Los Puros Corridos Shakad
2000: Te quiero
2002: Oro Norteno
2004: Frente a frente
2004: Serie Top 10
2005: Éxitos eternos
2005: Corazón de oropel
2005: 18 éxitos eternos
2006: Grandes éxitos románticos  
2006: Necesito dueña
2006: Puros madrazos: Rancheras y corridos
2006: Plaza Nueva
2007: Muchachita de ojos tristes
2007: Dueño de ti
2007: Cuando el sol salga al revés
2009: Quién es usted
2009: Puras Cumbias
2009: Puros Corridos y Norteñas
2009: Colecion Privada – Las 20 Exclusivas
2010: Cosas Raras (Single)
2010: Rey de la Banda y Norteño
2010: Millonario de amor
2010: A mi gente...Mis canciones
2011: Recordando Al Shaka
2011: Lo mejor de Sinaloa
2012: Puros Corridos Shakas
2012: 30 años
2012: Con la luz de un rayo
2012: Pa’ la raza enamorada
2012: Sergio Vega 20 Exitos
2012: Mis Favoritas
2013: A Traves De La Luna
2013: El 21 Black Jack
2014: Desde el cielo
2016: Serie éxitos
2016: Club Corridos Presenta: Amores pasados
2019: Solo Exitos

References

External links
https://archive.today/20130221021456/http://www.debate.com.mx/eldebate/Articulos/ArticuloGeneral.asp?IdArt=9985806&IdCat=6098
 Sergio Vega artist discography Yahoo!Music

1969 births
2010 deaths
Mexican male singers
People murdered by Mexican drug cartels
Mexican murder victims
Deaths by firearm in Mexico